Cupidopsis cissus, the common meadow blue, is a butterfly of the family Lycaenidae. It is found in most of Africa, south of the Sahara.

The wingspan is 22–34 mm for males and 23–36 mm for females. Adults are on wing from September to April and May and sometimes in June and July in subtropical areas.

The larvae feed on the flowers of Eriosema and Vigna species.

Subspecies
Cupidopsis cissus cissus (Senegal: Basse Casmance and south-east, Guinea, Burkina Faso, Sierra Leone, Liberia, Ivory Coast, Ghana, Togo, Nigeria: south and the Cross River loop, Kenya, northern Zambia, Mozambique, Zimbabwe, Botswana, Namibia, Eswatini, Lesotho, Madagascar, South Africa: Limpopo Province, Mpumalanga, North West Province, Gauteng, Free State Province, KwaZulu-Natal, Eastern Cape Province, Western Cape Province, Northern Cape Province)
Cupidopsis cissus extensa Libert, 2003 (Gabon, Congo, Angola, Democratic Republic of the Congo)

References

Seitz, A. Die Gross-Schmetterlinge der Erde 13: Die Afrikanischen Tagfalter. Plate XIII 71

Butterflies described in 1824
Polyommatini